David Levinson (August 4, 1939 – November 4, 2019) was an American television producer and writer known for such series as Hart to Hart, Nikita, 21 Jump Street, A Case of Rape and The Virginian.

He was nominated for an Emmy Award in 1971 for the television series The Bold Ones: The Senator.

David Levinson married actress Jan Shutan in 1980. He died on November 4, 2019, in Beverly Hills, California. He was buried in Mount Sinai Memorial Park Cemetery.

References

External links

1939 births
2019 deaths
People from Chicago
American television producers
American television writers